"I Believe in You (Je crois en toi)" is a duet by Celine Dion and Il Divo, released as the third and last single from Dion's On ne change pas album (2005), and first and only from Il Divo's Ancora (2005). At first, on 23 January 2006 "I Believe in You" was released as a radio single in the United States. The commercial single was issued 1 May 2006 in France and Switzerland. It was also released as a radio single in Canada, in May 2006.

Background and release
Luc Plamondon, with whom Dion worked in 1991 on her Dion chante Plamondon album, wrote French lyrics for the song.

There was no music video made for the song.

Dion and Il Divo promoted "I Believe in You" in various French television shows, performing it in late 2005.

The single peaked at number 30 in France and number 35 in Switzerland. In the US, it reached number 31 on the US Hot Adult Contemporary Tracks. Surprisingly, nearly 3 years after its release the song peaked at number 8 on the Portuguese Singles Chart according to Billboard magazine.

"I Believe in You" was featured on the official 2006 FIFA World Cup album, called Voices from the FIFA World Cup, which was released on 20 May 2006.

Il Divo are not the first opera singers who have performed and recorded with Dion. She had previously collaborated with Luciano Pavarotti on "I Hate You Then I Love You" and Andrea Bocelli on "The Prayer." The latter has been also performed by Dion and Josh Groban.

Critical reception
While reviewing Ancora, James Christopher Monger of AllMusic wrote: "They fawn over Celine Dion—who can barely contain her own affections..." Rob Theakston who reviewed Dion's On ne change pas on AllMusic, wrote that having the new songs, including the duet, was a "plus side" to the compilation.

Track listing and formats
European CD single
"I Believe in You (Je crois en toi)" – 4:00
"Hasta Mi Final" – 3:36

Versions
There are two released versions of the song, the difference is heard where the line "Someday I'll find you" is sung by a different member of Il Divo.  On Dion's On ne change pas album the line is sung by Swiss tenor Urs Buhler, and on Il Divo's Ancora album the same line is sung by Spanish baritone Carlos Marín.  This is due to them swapping lines, where the other line swapped is part of the harmony in Dion's verse (the second verse).  

A third version of the duet performed entirely in English (Dion's verse included) was also recorded, but never released.  Il Divo performed this version in their concerts with tenor David Miller singing Dion's parts.

Charts

Release history

References

External links
 

Celine Dion songs
2006 singles
French-language songs
Vocal collaborations
Songs written by Jörgen Elofsson
Songs written by Per Magnusson
Songs written by David Kreuger
Songs with lyrics by Luc Plamondon